Challenger is a Pakistani reality-based adventure game show, first aired 19 December 2013 on Hum Sitaray. The show offers 16 candidates the chance to be stranded in a remote locale, with limited resources, in the hopes that one person will outlast the others and secure the show's one-million-dollar prize. Each week, the contestants have to perform a variety of exhausting tasks: the winners get extra supplies; the losers get voted off the site.

References

External links 
 

Pakistani reality television series
Hum Sitaray